"Broken" is a song by South African rock band Seether, first appearing on their debut album, Disclaimer (2002). It was reworked and recorded again in 2004, this time featuring American singer Amy Lee, the lead singer of Evanescence and then-girlfriend of Seether vocalist Shaun Morgan. It was included on the soundtrack to the 2004 Marvel Comics superhero film The Punisher, and was also on Seether's second studio album, Disclaimer II.

Released as a single on 19 April 2004, "Broken" peaked at number 20 on the US Billboard Hot 100, number three in Australia, and number two in New Zealand. It was later certified Platinum by the Recording Industry Association of America (RIAA) and the Australian Recording Industry Association (ARIA). It is the band's biggest pop hit and is often considered Seether's most popular track, as well as their only song to enter and crossover to the US pop and adult contemporary charts, but it is not their highest-charting single on the Mainstream Rock Tracks chart and Modern Rock Tracks chart. Despite this, it was the most played song on most rock radio formats due to the pop success of the song. In addition, it still charted highly, peaking at number nine on the Mainstream Rock Tracks chart and number four on the Modern Rock Tracks chart.

Shaun Morgan wrote the song about the breakup of his marriage and family, after his wife chose to remain in South Africa with their daughter rather than accompany him to live in the United States.

Critical reception
While reviewing Disclaimer, Jason D. Taylor of the website AllMusic noted, "The album closes with the one successful laid-back song: 'Broken' is mellow yet confident, as vocalist Shaun Morgan finds the courage to open himself up without releasing a scream every few seconds." The song earned Seether a Metal Edge Readers' Choice Award in 2004, when it was voted "Best Song from a Movie Soundtrack".

Music video
Directed by Nigel Dick, the video features Morgan sitting in an abandoned car playing an acoustic guitar while Amy Lee, wearing black angel wings, appears behind him as her vocals fade in. For the rest of the video, Lee and Morgan wander through a dilapidated landscape that was revealed on the Disclaimer II DVD to be a real-life trailer park that was burned to ashes by a crystal meth lab explosion. Although there are shots of the band and Lee performing together in a clearing, the underlying theme of the video is that Lee and Morgan are looking for but will never find each other. Lee knows that Morgan is there and where he is throughout the video but Morgan is unaware of her presence around him, which explains the lyrics "you've gone away... you don't feel me here anymore".

Track listings

US, European, and Australian maxi-CD single
 "Broken" (featuring Amy Lee)
 "69 Tea"
 "Something in the Way" ("Live X" session at 99X, Atlanta)
 "Out of My Way"
 "Broken" (video)

European CD single
 "Broken" featuring Amy Lee – 4:18
 "Out of My Way" – 3:51

European mini-CD single
 "Broken" featuring Amy Lee (album version) – 4:18
 "Got It Made" – 5:10

Credits and personnel
Credits are taken from the Disclaimer II liner notes.

Studios
 Recorded and mixed at Henson Recording Studio (Hollywood, California)
 Mastered at The Lodge (New York City)

Personnel

 Shaun Morgan – writing (as Shaun Welgemoed), vocals, guitar
 Dale Stewart – writing, bass, vocals
 Amy Lee – featured vocals, string arrangement
 Pat Callahan – additional guitars
 John Humphrey – drums
 Double G – string arrangement
 Bob Marlette – production, mixing, engineering
 Dan "I Love the Metric System!" Certa – recording engineer
 Alex Gibson – recording engineer (strings)
 Jeremy Parker – assistant recording engineer
 Jeff Moses – assistant recording engineer
 Sid Riggs – Pro Tools recording and mix engineering
 Jon Berkowitz – assistant mix engineering
 Emily Lazar – mastering

Charts

Weekly charts

Year-end charts

Certifications

Release history

References

2004 singles
2004 songs
Amy Lee songs
Epic Records singles
Male–female vocal duets
Music videos directed by Nigel Dick
The Punisher (2004 film)
Seether songs
Song recordings produced by Bob Marlette
Songs written by Dale Stewart
Songs written by Shaun Morgan
Wind-up Records singles